Semyon Konstantinovich Timoshenko (Semyon Konstantinovich Timoshenko; , Semen Kostiantynovych Tymoshenko) ( – 31 March 1970) was a Soviet military commander and Marshal of the Soviet Union.

Early life
Born in Orman in the Bessarabia Governorate of the Russian Empire (present-day Furmanivka in Odesa Oblast, Ukraine), to an ethnic Ukrainian family.

Military career

First World War
In 1914, he was drafted into the army of the Russian Empire and served as a cavalryman on Russia's western front in the First World War. Upon the outbreak of the Russian Revolution in 1917, he sided with the Bolsheviks, joining the Red Army in 1918 and the Russian Communist Party (Bolsheviks) in 1919.

Russian Civil War
During the Russian Civil War of 1917–1923, Timoshenko served on various fronts. He fought against Polish forces in Kiev and then against Pyotr Wrangel's White Army and Nestor Makhno's Black Army. His most important encounter occurred at Tsaritsyn, where he commanded a cavalry regiment and met and befriended Joseph Stalin, who was responsible for the city's defense. The personal connection would ensure his rapid advancement after Stalin gained control of the Communist Party by the end of the 1920s. In 1920–1921, Timoshenko served under Semyon Budyonny and Kliment Voroshilov in the 1st Cavalry Army; Budyonny and Voroshilov became the core of the "Cavalry Army clique" which, under Stalin's patronage, would dominate the Red Army for many years. In April 1920, he was given command of the Sixth Division of the Red Cavalry, which was the first to attack the Polish army during the 'May offensive' launched by the Red Army during the Polish-Soviet War. On 29 May, the Sixth Division charged Polish trenches, taking heavy casualties for no gain, which convinced the Soviet commanders that charging trenches was pointless.

The 1930s
By the end of the civil and Polish–Soviet wars, Timoshenko had become the commander of the Red Army cavalry forces. Thereafter, under Stalin, he became Red Army commander in Byelorussia (1933); in Kiev (1935); in the northern Caucasus and then Kharkiv (1937); and Kiev again (1938). In 1939, he was given command of the entire western border region and led the Ukrainian Front during the Soviet invasion of eastern Poland. He also became a member of the Communist Party's Central Committee. Due to being a loyal friend of Stalin, Timoshenko survived the Great Purge to become the Red Army's senior professional soldier.

World War II: The Winter War
In January 1940, Timoshenko took charge of the Soviet armies fighting Finland in the Soviet-Finnish War. This had begun the previous November, under the disastrous command of Kliment Voroshilov. Under Timoshenko's leadership, the Soviets succeeded in breaking through the Finnish Mannerheim Line on the Karelian Isthmus, prompting Finland to sue for peace in March. His reputation increased, Timoshenko was made the People's Commissar for Defence and a Marshal of the Soviet Union in May, replacing Marshal Voroshilov as the Minister of Defence.

British historian John Erickson has written:

Although by no means a military intellectual, Timoshenko had at least passed through the higher command courses of the Red Army and was a fully trained 'commander-commissar'. During the critical period of the military purge, Stalin had used Timoshenko as a military district commander who could hold key appointments while their incumbents were liquidated or exiled.

Timoshenko was a competent but traditionalist military commander who nonetheless saw the urgent need to modernise the Red Army if, as expected, it was to fight a war against Nazi Germany. Overcoming the opposition of other more conservative leaders, he undertook the mechanisation of the Red Army and the production of more tanks. He also reintroduced much of the traditional harsh discipline of the Tsarist Russian Army.

In June 1940, Timoshenko ordered the formation of the Baltic Military District in the occupied Baltic states.

World War II
In the weeks before the German invasion of the Soviet Union, Timoshenko and Zhukov were worried by reports that German planes were crossing the soviet border at least 10 times a day, and on 13 June, they asked Stalin for permission to put the troops on the western border on high alert, but were overruled because Stalin was convinced that there would be no German invasion before spring 1942. 

General Ivan Boldin, deputy commander on the western front, recounted in memoirs published 20 years later that early in the morning of the invasion, on 22 June, when several towns in Belarus, including Grodno, were being bombed, aircraft destroyed on the ground, troops were being strafed, and German paratroopers were landing behind Red Army lines, Timoshenko rang him with an instruction that "no action is to be taken against the Germans without our knowledge  ... Comrade Stalin has forbidden to open artillery fire against the Germans".
 
On 23 June, Timoshenko was named chairman of Stavka, the Soviet Armed Forces High Command. In July 1941, Stalin replaced Timoshenko as Defense Commissar and Stavka's chairman. At the same time, the Western Front was divided into three sectors, with Timoshenko put in commmand of the  Central Front to supervise a fighting retreat from the border to Smolensk. The Northern Front  was commanded by Voroshilov, and the Southwestern Front by Budyonny, both of whom were removed by Stalin after only a few weeks for incompetence. On 23 October, the Soviets made Timoshenko command the entire southern half of the Eastern Front and Georgy Zhukov command the northern half. In November and December 1941 Timoshenko organized major counter offensives in the Rostov region, as well as carving a bridgehead into German defenses south of Kharkiv in January 1942.

In May 1942, Timoshenko, with 640,000 men, launched a counter-offensive (the Second Battle of Kharkiv) which was the first Soviet attempt to gain initiative in the springtime war. After initial Soviet successes, the Germans struck back at Timoshenko's exposed southern flank, halting the offensive, encircling Timoshenko's armies, and turning the battle into a major Soviet defeat.

The fact that he was the most senior Soviet army officer with a front line command during most of the first year after the German invasion turned Timoshenko, briefly, into an international celebrity, lionised in the USA and UK in particular as a supposed military genius. According to an account written later in the war:

 
General Georgy Zhukov's success in defending Moscow during December 1941 had persuaded Stalin that he was a better commander than Timoshenko. On 22 July 1942, Stalin replaced Timoshenko with Vasily Gordov as Commander of the Stalingrad Front due to his failures up to that point in the war, making him Chairman of the High Command. He was called back into service as overall commander of the Northwestern Front between October 1942 and March 1943.

In 1945, Timoshenko attended the Yalta Conference. A rumor started in the western press that Stalin had attacked Timoshenko, but was later disproved.

Between 15 August 1945 and 15 September 1945, Timoshenko traveled alone to review the Starye Dorogi displaced persons camp where Auschwitz concentration camp survivors recuperated after their liberation. Later, author Primo Levi (Prisoner 174517) wrote in The Truce of how the extremely tall Timoshenko "unfolded himself from a tiny Fiat 500A Topolino" to announce that the liberated survivors would soon begin their final journey home.

Postwar and death
After the war, Timoshenko was reappointed commander of the Baranovichi Military District (Byelorussian Military District since March 1946), then of the South Urals Military District (June 1946); and then the Byelorussian Military District once again (March 1949). In 1960, he was appointed Inspector-General of the Defence Ministry, a largely honorary post. From 1961 he chaired the State Committee for War Veterans. 

Timoshenko died at Moscow on 31 March 1970 at the age of 75. He was honoured with a state funeral and was cremated on 3 April. The urn containing his ashes was buried in the Kremlin Wall Necropolis.

In Literature 
During the war with Poland, Isaac Babel rode with a cavalry unit commanded by Timoshenko, who was then aged 25, and who appeared as a named character in at least two of the stories Babel wrote about his war experiences, one of which was originally published in Odesa under the title 'Timoshenko and Melnikov'. When the stories were republished, his name was changed to Savitsky, after Budyonny had denounced Babel's work as "slander" by a "literary degenerate." Babel's story My First Goose opens with this description:

In Babel's The Story of a Horse - originally 'Timoshenko and Melnikov', 'Savitsky' is described as having been removed from his command, and living with a Cossack woman, and is accused of having taken a white stallion that belonged a rival officer, who tries in vain to get it back.

Awards

Russian Empire

Soviet Union

Honorary revolutionary weapon—a sword with a nominal Order of the Red Banner (28 November 1920)

Foreign awards

References

Citations

General sources

 

  (1975, 2003)

External links 

 Portrait of Marshal Semyon Timoshenko at the UK national archives

1895 births
1970 deaths
Bolsheviks
Burials at the Kremlin Wall Necropolis
Central Committee of the Communist Party of the Soviet Union members
Fifth convocation members of the Soviet of the Union
First convocation members of the Soviet of Nationalities
First convocation members of the Verkhovna Rada of the Ukrainian Soviet Socialist Republic
Fourth convocation members of the Soviet of the Union
Heroes of the Soviet Union
Marshals of the Soviet Union
Occupation of the Baltic states
People from Akkermansky Uyezd
People from Odesa Oblast
People of the Russian Revolution
People of the Soviet invasion of Poland
Recipients of the Cross of St. George
Recipients of the Military Order of the White Lion
Recipients of the Order of Lenin
Recipients of the Order of Suvorov, 1st class
Recipients of the Order of the Red Banner
Recipients of the Order of Victory
Russian military personnel of World War I
Second convocation members of the Soviet of the Union
Seventh convocation members of the Soviet of Nationalities
Sixth convocation members of the Soviet of Nationalities
Soviet military personnel of World War II
Soviet Ministers of Defence
Third convocation members of the Soviet of the Union
Ukrainian people of World War I
Ukrainian people of World War II